Bao Fan (born 18 October 1970) is a Chinese investment banker and investor, the chairman and CEO of China Renaissance, which he founded in 2005.

In 2015, Bao was featured on Bloomberg Markets 50 Most Influential, ranking number 22.

In February 2023, Bao was arrested by Chinese authorities.

Early life and education
Bao was born in Shanghai to parents who worked in the government. In reference to his parents' placement within the government, Bao notes they were "Nothing senior, I'm not one of the princelings". He went to high school in the US.

He received degrees from Shanghai's Fudan University and the Norwegian School of Management.

Career
Bao worked for Morgan Stanley, Credit Suisse and Morgan Stanley again, in London, New York and Hong Kong. In 2000, Bao left Morgan Stanley to become chief strategic officer at the Chinese start-up AsiaInfo Holdings.

In 2005, Bao founded China Renaissance, a leading Chinese financial institution dedicated to China's New Economy businesses. Started as a financial advisory firm, China Renaissance's core business now consists of investment banking, investment management and wealth management.

As of 30 June 2020, China Renaissance had advised on approximately 980 transactions worth over US$146 billion since its inception, and the company's private equity funds had AUM of approximately RMB39.0 billion in new economy investments.

China Renaissance Holdings Limited was listed on the Main Board of HKEX in 2018, under the stock ticker (1911.HK).

China Renaissance started a private equity investment management business in 2013. Bao is the Founding Partner and Chief Investment Officer of China Renaissance's investment management business. Huxing Growth Capital, the investment flagship of China Renaissance has invested in over 100 new economy entrepreneurs and home-grown companies and has helped over 30 of these firms go public in China and international markets. Its private equity funds recorded an average multiple of invested capital (MOIC) of 2.5x and internal rate of return (IRR) of 33 per cent as of 30 June 2020. The portfolio companies of Huaxing Growth Capital include Pop Mart, Kuaishou, Beike Zhaofang (Lianjia), Jiangxiaobai, Didi Chuxing, Meituan, Li Auto, WuXi AppTec, MININGLAMP Technology, Focus Media, LEXIN and Micro-Tech Endoscopy.

In February 2016, China Renaissance received FinanceAsia Achievement Awards for "Best China Deal" and "Best Private Equity Deal". The "Best China Deal" was for its role as the financial advisor for Meituan and Dianping's "strategic cooperation". Meituan-Dianping is China's largest group deals website, and in January 2016 it closed a $3.3 billion funding round, valuing the merged company at $18 billion. The company claims that this is China's largest ever funding round for a venture-backed Internet startup.

In February 2023, the BBC and other sources reported that Bao had been missing for two days and they were unsure of his whereabouts. The disappearance has caused the stock of China Renaissance to drop by 50 percent, though the company said in a statement that Operations would "continue normally". Later, the company announced that Bao was taken by the Chinese authorities as a part of an investigation. According to Reuters, the investigation is targeting Bao's former colleague and the company's former president, Cong Lin.

Personal life
Bao lives in Beijing.

References

1970 births
Living people
Businesspeople from Shanghai
Chinese bankers
Enforced disappearances in China
Missing person cases in China
Prisoners and detainees of China
Chinese expatriates in the United States
Fudan University alumni
BI Norwegian Business School alumni
20th-century Chinese businesspeople
21st-century Chinese businesspeople